The Assam cricket team is a domestic cricket team represents the Indian state of Assam, run by the Assam Cricket Association. They compete and represent the state annually in the first-class Ranji Trophy tournament, limited-overs Vijay Hazare Trophy tournament and the Twenty20 Syed Mushtaq Ali Trophy.

History
Assam played their first first-class match in the 1948–49 Ranji Trophy, captained by Rupert Kettle, who also scored their first century two seasons later. They had their first victory in the 1951–52 Ranji Trophy, when they beat Orissa by 103 runs; the captain, Peter Bullock, top-scored in each innings with 31 and 148, and took 7 for 70 and 3 for 29.

Until the 2002–03 season, when the zonal system was abandoned, Assam formed part of East Zone, and never progressed further than the pre-quarter-finals. They won their plate group in 2006/07 before losing the semi-final to Orissa. In the 2009–10 season Assam entered the elite group of the Ranji Trophy, and topped the plate group and subsequently progressed to the Super League. However, in the 2010–11 season, they ended at the bottom of their group in the Super League and were relegated to the Plate League for the next season. In the 2012–13 Vijay Hazare Trophy Assam played extremely well and finished runners-up. In the 2014–15 Ranji season Assam were again promoted to Group A level. In the 2015–16 Ranji Trophy, the team reached the semi-final for the first time in their history.

In September 2017, former Indian batsman Lalchand Rajput was named as head coach of Assam cricket team for two Ranji Trophy seasons.

Home grounds
Assam Cricket Association Stadium, Barsapara, Guwahati
Nehru Stadium, Guwahati, Hosted 14 ODIs.
Amingaon Cricket Ground, Amingaon 
Northeast Frontier Railway Stadium, Maligaon, Guwahati 
Satindra Mohan Dev Stadium, Silchar

Since Assam played its first home match in 1948, it has also played first-class home matches in (in chronological order) Shillong, Jorhat, Nowgong, Dibrugarh, Karimganj, Hailakandi, Mangaldoi and Tinsukia.

Famous players

 Riyan Parag
 Abu Nechim
 Anup Ghatak
 Arlen Konwar
 Gautam Dutta
 Hemanga Baruah
 Javed Zaman
 Krishna Das
 Nishanta Bordoloi
 Zahir Alam
 Rajesh Borah
 Subhrajit Saikia
 Zakaria Zuffri

Current squad

Updated as on 24 January 2023

Coaching staff

 Head coach: Trevor Gonsalves
 Assistant coach: Salil Sinha and Subhrajit Saikia
 Trainer: Bhaskar Borah
 Physio: Dr Koustob Bharadwaj
 Video analyst: Rajesh Sharma

Records
For more details on this topic, see List of Assam first-class cricket records, List of Assam List A cricket records, List of Assam Twenty20 cricket records.

See also
List of Assam cricketers

References

External links
First-class records for Assam
ListA records for Assam
Twenty 20 records for Assam

Indian first-class cricket teams
Cricket in Assam
1948 establishments in India
Cricket clubs established in 1948